Rachel Margaret Dunn (born 14 November 1982) is a former English international netball player. Dunn debuted for the England national netball team in 2004 against South Africa, and was a member of the England teams that won bronze medals at the 2006 and 2010 Commonwealth Games, and a silver medal at the 2010 World Netball Series.

Domestically, Dunn has made over 200 Netball Superleague appearances, and played for Wasps Netball until the administration of the club in November 2022.   Dunn played for Team Bath before switching to Surrey Storm in 2009. In May 2008, Dunn was signed to play in the Australasian ANZ Championship for the Canterbury Tactix in New Zealand, replacing pregnant Tactix shooter Jodi Brown.

Dunn was selected in the 12-player squad for England at the 2019 Netball World Cup.

References

External links
 Surrey Storm profile

English netball players
Commonwealth Games bronze medallists for England
Netball players at the 2006 Commonwealth Games
Netball players at the 2010 Commonwealth Games
Mainland Tactix players
Alumni of the University of Bath
1982 births
Living people
Sportspeople from Cambridge
Team Bath netball players
Netball players at the 2014 Commonwealth Games
Commonwealth Games medallists in netball
Netball Superleague players
2019 Netball World Cup players
Wasps Netball players
Surrey Storm players
AENA Super Cup players
English expatriate netball people in New Zealand
2011 World Netball Championships players
2015 Netball World Cup players
Medallists at the 2006 Commonwealth Games
Medallists at the 2010 Commonwealth Games